Edwin Anthony Holder  (born July 14, 1954) is a Canadian retired politician who served as the 64th mayor of London from 2018 to 2022. He was previously the federal Member of Parliament for London West from 2008 to 2015 as a member of the Conservative Party.

Political career 
On March 19, 2014, Holder was appointed Minister of State (Science and Technology) and sworn in as a member of the Queen's Privy Council for Canada.

On October 19, 2015, Holder was defeated in the Canadian federal election, losing in the riding of London West to Kate Young.

In October 2017, Holder announced that he was seeking the Progressive Conservative Party of Ontario nomination in London West for the 42nd Ontario general election. In January 2018, he withdrew from the nomination contest.

On July 12, 2018, Holder declared his candidacy for the mayoralty of London, Ontario to be decided during the 2018 municipal election. On October 23, 2018, Holder was elected mayor, winning on the 14th round of counting in the city's and Canada's first-ever ranked ballot municipal election.

Holder was mayor of London during the aftermath following the London, Ontario truck attack on June 6, 2021. He attended a large memorial for the family who were killed in the attack. The memorial was one of the largest such gatherings in Ontario since the COVID-19 pandemic in Ontario had begun. In May 2022, he announced that he won't run for a second term as mayor, retiring from politics. During the 2022 Mayoral campaign, Holder endorsed Deputy Mayor Josh Morgan. Morgan would go on to win the Mayoral election on October 24, 2022 after capturing 65% of the vote.

Electoral record

Mayoral race

Federal races

Notes

References

External links 
 Ed Holder
 

1954 births
Conservative Party of Canada MPs
Living people
Members of the House of Commons of Canada from Ontario
Members of the King's Privy Council for Canada
Mayors of London, Ontario
Politicians from Toronto
Members of the 28th Canadian Ministry